Dallas is a city in, and the county seat of, Paulding County, Georgia, United States. The estimated population, as of 2010, was 11,544. It was named for George M. Dallas, Vice President of the United States, under James K. Polk.

History

The area where in and around Dallas was originally held by the Muscogee people, but would eventually lose their land in battle to the Cherokee in 1755.  The area became a crossroads for the Cherokee who lived in the area.

When gold was discovered in Georgia in 1828, it began what was known as the Georgia Gold Rush.  Paulding County was soon separated into 40-acre "Gold Lots" during the Gold Lottery of 1832 and people came from other parts of Georgia and other states to seek gold.  The settlers found little gold in the area, with only small amounts being found in mines at Lost Mountain.  Many settlers began using their parcels of land to grow crops instead.

During the time the Georgia Gold Rush began to happen, the Cherokee people began to be forced off of their lands.  Not long after, the Indian Removal Act was signed by president Andrew Jackson, effectively removing the Native Americans to Indian Territory west of the Mississippi River on the Trail of Tears.

When the Georgia General Assembly took the original western portion of Paulding County to create Polk County in 1852, it also took with it the original county seat, Van Wert. The legislature ceded western portions of Cobb County to create the newly-drawn Paulding County, thus making it necessary for the creation of a new town to serve as the county seat. Its first commissioners were James H. Ballinger, James S. Hackett, Hezekiah Harrison, John S. Poole, and Garrett H. Spinks. The new town of Dallas was named for then Vice-President of the United States, George Mifflin Dallas, of Pennsylvania. He served under President James Knox Polk, for whom the new county to the west had been named.

The Dallas area is home to multiple battle sites that were part of the Atlanta Campaign in the American Civil War in 1864.  The Battle of Dallas took place near downtown Dallas.  The Battle of New Hope Church and the Battle of Pickett's Mill were also fought during the same week, both of which are typically considered to part of Battle of Dallas engagement.  The original earthworks, including the battle trenches have been preserved at both the New Hope Church site and at the Pickett's Mill Historic Battlefield Site.

After the reconstruction period, Dallas and Paulding County began to flourish.  Construction of the Southern and Seaboard Railroads began in 1882.  Paulding County was also introduced to the textile industry at this time.  Both industries played a great role in the growth of the county.  Along with the introduction to the railroad and the textile industry, Paulding County's first newspaper was introduced, The Dallas New Era.

On October 18, 1903, "Ole 88" Engine 345, a steam-powered locomotive, jumped its tracks and tore down part of the Pumpkinvine Creek Trestle.  The Pumpkinvine Creek Trestle, which was originally built in 1901, was rebuilt after the accident.  The trestle is over 750 feet long and towers 126 feet above Pumpkinvine Creek.  The trestle was restored in 1999 and now serves as part of the Silver Comet Trail.

In 1951, the name of the Town of Dallas, Georgia was changed to The City of Dallas, Georgia.  The name change was accomplished to comply with federal legislation allowing “cities” to create housing authorities, and other federal-related entities.

On April 4, 1977, near the site marker for the Battle of New Hope Church, the forced landing of Southern Airways Flight 242 occurred.  The passenger jetliner, a McDonnell Douglas DC-9 with 81 passengers and 4 crew members, was flying from Northwest Alabama Regional Airport to Atlanta Municipal Airport.  Upon descending in altitude to prepare for landing in Atlanta, the jetliner started to fly through an intense thunderstorm near Rome, Georgia.  Because of the extreme amounts of water and hail that were ingested by the jet's engines, both of the Pratt & Whitney JT8D-7A turbojet engines were damaged and underwent flameout.  With the engines unable to restart, the flight's crew began gliding in hopes of reaching a nearby airport.  Upon finding out that there were no nearby airports to perform a landing, the crew found a straight section of rural road in Dallas, Georgia to try and land.  As the plane began to land, it clipped a gas station, convenience store, and other buildings, resulting in the plane to lose control of landing and ultimately crash, resulting in hull loss.  Both pilots and 61 passengers were killed by impact forces and fire. Nine people on the ground were also killed.

In the early 2000s the city completed a major refurbishment of downtown Dallas, which included adding and updating sidewalks, adding red brick to the roadways, creation of a large courtyard in the center of town, updating existing structural facades, adding a fountain area near the downtown gazebo, and further preserving historic downtown structures.

Culture

In 2019, the website Niche.com ranked Dallas as one of the Top 50 "Best Suburbs to Buy a House in Georgia".

Dallas Farmers Market

Every Saturday during the spring and summer, local farmers, cooks, and crafters set up in downtown Dallas to provide the community with locally made and homegrown goods.  It has become one of the more popular events that goes on in downtown Dallas since it began.

Dallas Concert Series

The Dallas Concert Series is an event that is generally held once a month during the summer, with a music stage being set up in downtown Dallas for musicians scheduled to play.  Various food vendors are also present for concert series.  Some well-known bands have previously played at the concert series, such as Night Ranger, Chris Janson, and Mother's Finest.

Food Truck Friday

During certain Fridays over the summer, Dallas holds an event called "Food Truck Friday" that brings together a wide variety of local food trucks throughout the summer.  Besides the food trucks providing food and refreshments, there is usually a local band that is set up to play music through the afternoon and evening.

Geography

Dallas is located at  (33.918499, -84.840848).

Dallas is part of the Deep South cultural and geographic subregion. Dallas is also a part of the physiographic region of the greater Appalachian Mountains.

The drainage area for all waterways flowing through the area are classified as being in the Alabama-Coosa-Tallapoosa River Basin. There are no major rivers that flow through Dallas itself, but there are multiple large creeks, with the largest being Pumpkinvine Creek, which is a tributary of the Etowah River.

Climate

Dallas has a humid subtropical climate that is local to all of Georgia.

Snow flurries occasionally fall in the winter months, when there is the presence of a deep trough in the jet stream over the eastern third of the United States. Although at times significant amounts of snowfall have been recorded, some years have no measurable snowfall.  The Storm of the Century (1993) in March 1993 brought  to Dallas, with drifts measuring several feet.  In December 2017, Dallas recorded  of snow that had fallen within a two-day period. 
 The  that fell in Dallas was tied for the highest total amount of snowfall in the Atlanta metro area, with the Carter's Lake area being the only other place to receive that amount.

It's not uncommon for Northwest Georgia to be prone to drought some years, but there are also some years where precipitation amounts are very high.

Demographics

2020 census

As of the 2020 United States census, there were 14,042 people, 4,944 households, and 3,275 families residing in the city.

2014
As of the census of 2014, there were 12,629 people, 2,014 households, and 1,303 families residing in the city. The racial makeup of the city was 61.1% White, 31.2% African American, 0.4% Native American, 1.32% Asian, 0.02% Pacific Islander, 0.89% from other races, and 3.1% from two or more races. Hispanic or Latino of any race were 7.2% of the population. 56.2% were non-Hispanic White (U.S.Census). 11.7% of the population was foreign born as of 2014 (U.S. Census).
There were 4,970 households, out of which 37.3% had children under the age of 18 living with them, 43.0% were married couples living together, 27.6% had a female householder with no husband present, and 35.3% were non-families. 30.2% of all households were made up of individuals, and 10.3% had someone living alone who was 65 years of age or older.  The average household size was 2.86 and the average family size was 3.01. The median value of owner-occupied housing units between 2010 and 2014 was $110,200 (U.S.Census).

In the city, the population was spread out, with 29.7% under the age of 18, 12.1% from 18 to 24, 32.3% from 25 to 44, 14.8% from 45 to 64, and 12.4% who were 65 years of age or older.  The median age was 29 years. For every 100 females, there were 83.0 males.  For every 100 females age 18 and over, there were 74.8 males.

The median income for a household in the city was $33,750, and the median income for a family was $38,308. Males had a median income of $30,245 versus $21,747 for females. The per capita income for the city was $18,461.  About 19.8% of families and 23.7% of the population were below the poverty line, including 17.3% of those under age 18 and 13.3% of those age 65 or over.

Transportation

Major roads

  U.S. Route 278
  State Route 6
  State Route 61
  State Route 120
  State Route 381

Airports

To the west of Dallas is the Silver Comet Field at Paulding Northwest Atlanta Airport, which is a general aviation airport.  It is the ninth local airport in metro Atlanta, and the first new jet-capable airport in Georgia since 1975.

The Hartsfield–Jackson Atlanta International Airport is located in nearby Atlanta.

Pedestrians and cycling

 Dallas Trail Connect
 Silver Comet Trail
 Mount Tabor Park Mountain Bike Trail
 Sara Babb Park Biking Trail

Education

Primary and secondary schools

Public schools

The Paulding County School District is a public school district that consists of Pre-School to Grade 12, and consists of nineteen elementary schools, nine middle schools, and five high schools. The district has 1,212 full-time teachers and over 19,283 students.

Private schools
 Brighton Private School
 Victory Christian Academy

Higher education
 Georgia Highlands College (Paulding Site)
 Kennesaw State University (Paulding Site)
 Chattahoochee Technical College

Economy

Major employers
 Atlanta Film Studios - Paulding County
 Metromont Corporation
 City of Dallas
 Wellstar Paulding Hospital
 Chattahoochee Technical College
 Georgia Highlands College
 MG International
 Cadillac Products
 Dallas Millworks
 T&R Fixtures
 Top Flight Aerostructures
 Aerospace Fabricators of Georgia
 Simmons Engineering
 West Cobb Engineering
 Interroll

Recreation

There are many parks in the Dallas area, including Mount Tabor Park, Orphan Brigade Battlefield Park, White Oak Park, Burnt Hickory Park, Sara Babb Park, Coleman Camp Park, and Elizabeth McCoon Memorial Park.

The Paulding Forest Wildlife Management Area also provides areas for camping, biking, hunting, hiking, and fishing.

Silver Comet Trail

The Silver Comet Trail is a 61.5-mile long stretch of fully paved pedestrian/bicycling trail that follows the path of the abandoned Seaboard Air Line Railroad that was built in the 1890s.  The railway served as the primary passenger train route between New York City, Atlanta, and Birmingham, Alabama via the Silver Comet streamliner train.  In 1969, after declining ridership over the years, SAL merged with Atlantic Coast Line to form Seaboard Coast Line on July 1, 1967. In 1969 SCL applied for the Silver Comet to be discontinued. The last run was in May 1969.CSXT abandoned a majority of the railway, in 1987 which was eventually purchased by various counties in Georgia, as well as the Georgia Department of Transportation in order to eventually create a pedestrian path.
The trail is "Railbanked" which means, in the future if railroad service is needed again due to traffic increases, the right of way can be bought by a Railroad and track relayed and it could become a Class 1 railroad again.

The trail starts in Smyrna, Georgia and ends at the Alabama/Georgia state line near Cedartown, Georgia where it then connects to the Chief Ladiga Trail in Piedmont, Alabama.  From there, the trail winds it way through Alabama until it reaches its end-point in Anniston, Alabama.

The Silver Comet Trail has been ranked as one of the Top 25 "Best Bike Trails in America" by Complex.com.

The trail is the second-longest rail trail in the United States.

Historical sites

There are many historical sites in the area, ranging from Civil War battle sites to historic buildings and monuments.  There are over 100 historic sites in Paulding County marked with historical markers.  Most of the markers in the area pertain to the Civil War conflict.

One of the more popular historic sites in the area is the Pickett's Mill Battlefield Site, which is one of the best-preserved Civil War battlefields in the nation.  Visitors can travel roads used by Union and Confederate troops, see earthworks constructed by these men, and walk through the same ravine where hundreds of soldiers died.  An authentic 1800s pioneer cabin is furnished and open for tours during certain events.

Points of interest

With Dallas being located in the Atlanta Metropolitan Area, there are a lot of activities nearby for visitors or residents.  The most popular of which are in Atlanta.

 Pickett's Mill Battlefield Site
 Paulding County Historical Society & Museum
 Paulding Forest - Wildlife Management Area
 High Shoals Falls
 Stars & Strikes Entertainment Center
 The Dallas Theater

Media

Television
Comcast Channel 24 airs news, information, upcoming event descriptions, dates and times, and photos of other events. The government-access television (GATV) cable TV channel provides key information to residents of Dallas and Paulding County. It also airs shorts on how to conserve water and electricity as well as messages from the mayor and other city board members.

Radio

WDJY (FM)/99.1 Talk
WDPC (AM)/1500 Christian/Gospel

Film

With the Atlanta Film Studios - Paulding County nearby in Hiram, Georgia, the Dallas area has become a popular place for filming.  Various movies, TV Series, and commercials have been filmed in the area.  One of the most popular places for filming recently has been at the Silver Comet Field at Paulding Northwest Atlanta Airport.

Movies that have been filmed in the area include Finding Steve McQueen,  The Last Full Measure and Beauty and the Beholder. The dramatic final scene of Finding Steve McQueen was filmed on Main St near the Dallas Theatre.  The CBS television series MacGyver filmed some episodes in Dallas.  The television series Stargirl, which is based on the DC Comics character of the same name, is currently being filmed in downtown Dallas.  The Ford Motor Company also filmed a commercial in the area, titled "Roll on Sister".

Notable people

Cecil Butler, professional baseball player
Chris Conley, American football wide receiver for the Jacksonville Jaguars
Jayne County, punk rock star
Christopher Dudley, keyboardist of UnderOATH
Patty Loveless, country music star
Gary North (economist), Christian economic historian and publisher
Ray Traylor (1963 – 2004), professional wrestler, best known for his appearances with World Wrestling Entertainment under the ring name Big Boss Man
Travis Tritt, country music star
Zack Wheeler, pitcher, #6 overall pick in the 2009 Major League Baseball Draft for the San Francisco Giants
Kelly Nelon Clark, southern gospel singer with Nelon Family Singers. Performs regularly with Bill Gaither Home Coming Friends
Caleb Lee Hutchinson, runner-up on season 16 of American Idol

Gallery

References

External links
 
 

Cities in Georgia (U.S. state)
Cities in Paulding County, Georgia
County seats in Georgia (U.S. state)